Crepis foetida  is a European species of flowering plant in the family Asteraceae with the common name stinking hawksbeard. It is widespread across much of Europe and Siberia, as well as being sparingly naturalized in scattered locations in the United States and Australia.

Crepis foetida   is an annual, biennial, or perennial herb up to 50 cm (20 inches) tall. One plant can produce as many as 10 flower heads, each with 100 or more yellow ray florets but no disc florets.

Subspecies
 Crepis foetida subsp. foetida
 Crepis foetida subsp. glandulosa (C.Presl) Arcang.
 Crepis foetida subsp. rhoeadifolia (M.Bieb.) Čelak.

References

External links
Online Atlas of the British & Irish Flora
 
Moravskoslezská pobočka, Crepis foetida subsp. foetida – škarda smrdutá pravá in Czech with photos
Portale Sulla Flora del Basso Corso del Lamone (Prov. Ravenna), Crepis foetida subsp. foetida in Italian with numerous photos
Flore Alpes in French with photos

foetida
Flora of Europe
Flora of Siberia
Plants described in 1753
Taxa named by Carl Linnaeus